The nodule (nodular lobe), or anterior end of the inferior vermis, abuts against the roof of the fourth ventricle, and can only be distinctly seen after the cerebellum has been separated from the medulla oblongata and pons.

On either side of the nodule is a thin layer of white substance, named the posterior medullary velum.

It is semilunar in form, its convex border being continuous with the white substance of the cerebellum; it extends on either side as far as the flocculus.

Additional Images

External links
 
 https://web.archive.org/web/20010514005529/http://www.ib.amwaw.edu.pl/anatomy/atlas/image_11e.htm

Cerebellum